Acacia baxteri, commonly known as Baxter's wattle, is a shrub belonging to the genus Acacia and the subgenus Phyllodineae, and is endemic to the south west of Western Australia.

Description
It blooms from September to December and produces yellow flowers. The shrub has rigid, striate-ribbed and glabrous branchlets. There is one simple inflorescence per axil with globular flower heads containing 30 to 50 flowers.

Taxonomy
The species was first formally described by the botanist George Bentham in 1842 in the work Notes on Mimoseae, with a synopsis of species. as published in London Journal of Botany. There are two recognised synonyms for A. baxteri; Acacia bagsteri as described by George Bentham and Racosperma baxteri as described by Leslie Pedley.

It is closely related to Acacia andrewsii and has phyllodes that are quite similar to Acacia unifissilis.

The species epithet, baxteri, commemorates Bagster (William Baxter).

Distribution
It is native to an area in the Wheatbelt and the  Great Southern regions of Western Australia. The population is disjunct with most found between Ongerup and Albany with scattered populations found further north. The shrub is commonly found s part of Eucalyptus woodlands or open mallee heath communities.

See also
 List of Acacia species

References

baxteri
Acacias of Western Australia
Plants described in 1842
Taxa named by George Bentham